Sean Michaels may refer to:
Sean Michaels (pornographic actor) (born 1958), pornographic actor
Sean Michaels (writer) (born 1982), novelist, music journalist and blogger
Shawn Michaels (was also alternatively spelled 'Sean') (born 1965), professional wrestler
Jesse James Hollywood (born 1980), drug dealer also known as Sean Michaels

See also
Sean Michael (born 1969), South African actor, writer and singer